Little Joe was launched in 1784 in Liverpool as a slave ship. She made six complete voyages from Liverpool in the Atlantic triangular slave trade. On her seventh voyage a French privateer captured her, but a British letter of marque recaptured her. She did not return to the slave trade and was last listed in 1795.

Career
Little Joe first appeared in Lloyd's Register (LR) in 1784.

1st slave voyage (1784–1785): Captain Robert Ward sailed from Liverpool on 15 June 1784, bound for the Windward Coast. Little Joe arrived at Barbados with 310 slaves and sailed for Dominica on 4 January 1785. She was at Dominica on 21 January 1785 with 309 slaves. She left Dominica on 18 March and arrived back at Liverpool on 24 April. She had left Liverpool with 37 crew members and had arrived at Dominica with 28. Over her entire voyage she suffered three crew deaths. When Little Joe arrived in  she reported that she had taken up the crew of the French vessel Providence, which had foundered in the Atlantic Ocean while on a voyage from Charleston to London.  Little Joe rescued the crew.

2nd slave voyage (1785–1786): Captain Ward sailed from Liverpool on 19 August 1785, bound for the Windward Coast. Little Joe arrived at Dominica on 17 February 1786 with 307 slaves. She arrived back at Liverpool on 3 May. She had left Liverpool with 41 crew members and she had arrived at Dominica with 43. She suffered no crew deaths on the voyage.

3rd slave voyage (1786–1787): Captain Ward sailed from Liverpool on 16 October 1786, bound for the Windward Coast. Little Joe arrived with her slaves on 13 June 1787. She first delivered 20 slaves to St Kitts. She then delivered 272 to Dominica, and lastly, six to Antigua. She left for Liverpool on 10 July and arrived there on 14 August. she had left Liverpool with 43 crew members and she arrived at St Kitts with 25. She suffered four crew deaths over the entire voyage.

4th slave voyage (1787–1789): Captain Alexander Grierson sailed from Liverpool on 2 December 1787. Little Joe gathered slaves first at Bassa and then elsewhere on the windward Coast before she sailed from Africa on 26 August 1788. She arrived at Grenada on 17 October with 301 slaves. She sailed from Grenada on 26 December and arrived back at Liverpool on 22 February 1789. She had left Liverpool with 34 crew members and she had suffered nine crew deaths on her voyage.

5th slave voyage (1789–1791): Captain Richard Jones sailed from Liverpool on 31 December 1789. Little Joe gathered her slaves at Bassa and left Africa on 25 September 1790.She arrived at Black River, Jamaica on 14 November with 146 slaves and landed 144. She sailed for Liverpool on 18 December and arrived there on 16 February 1791. She had left Liverpool with 30 crew members and she suffered one crew death on her voyage.

6th slave voyage (1791–1792): Captain Thomas Bridge sailed from Liverpool on 8 April 1791. Little Joe gathered her slaves at Bassa and sailed from Africa on 23 February 1792. She arrived at Grenada in March with 206 slaves. She arrived back at Liverpool on 23 June. She had left Liverpool with 19 crew members and she suffered six crew deaths on the voyage.

7th slave voyage (1791–1792): Captain Owen Jones sailed for the Windward Coast on 1 August 1792. He acquired a letter of marque on 21 March 1793, just after the outbreak of war with France. 

Little Joe was captured off the Junk River (now in Liberia).

 recaptured Little Joe and Echo.  recaptured Prosperity; the cutter  recaptured Mercury. Liberty ransomed Swift after plundering her.

Fate
Little Joe was last listed in LR in 1795, with data unchanged since 1793. The last mention of Little Joe in Lloyd's List occurred in February 1796 when Little Joe, Walsh, master, arrived at Limerick from Oporto.

Notes, citations, and references
Notes

Citations

References
 
 
 

1784 ships
Age of Sail merchant ships of England
Liverpool slave ships
Captured ships